The 2005 season of the Toppserien, the first-tier women's football (soccer) league in Norway, began on 16 April 2005 and ended on 22 October 2005.

18 games were played with 3 points given for wins and 1 for draws. Number nine and ten were originally relegated, but ninth-placed Liungen survived after Asker was forcibly relegated due to economic license issues.  The two top teams from the First Division were promoted.

Kolbotn won the league.

League table

Top goalscorers
 18 goals:
  Tone Heimlund, Fløya
 14 goals:
  Solveig Gulbrandsen, Kolbotn
 13 goals:
  Maureen Mmadu, Klepp
  Tonje Hansen, Kolbotn
  Isabell Herlovsen, Kolbotn
 12 goals:
  Dagny Mellgren, Klepp
  Lene Espedal, Kolbotn
 11 goals:
  Lindy Melissa Wiik, Asker
  Kristy Moore, Fløya
  Trine Rønning, Kolbotn
 10 goals:
  Ingunn Sørum, Liungen
 9 goals:
  Siri Nordby, Røa

Promotion and relegation
 Asker and Kattem were relegated to the First Division
 Arna-Bjørnar and Amazon Grimstad were promoted from the First Division

References

League table
Fixtures
Goalscorers

External links
Season on soccerway.com

Toppserien seasons
Top level Norwegian women's football league seasons
1
Nor
Nor